"A Zacinto" ("To Zakynthos") is a pre-Romantic sonnet written by Ugo Foscolo in 1803.

Short analysis
The sonnet is about the poet's feelings: when he wrote the poem he was in exile, so he knew that his remains would have been buried far away from his natal island, Zante, and nobody would have cried on his grave. The poet compares himself to Odysseus and finds a difference: the Greek hero, after the Trojan War and his long travel to home, returned to Ithaca and was buried there. The word , that is "reclined, lay" (second line), is an anticipation of the theme of death, which the last stanza focuses on.

In the sonnet there are both neoclassical and romantic elements: references to the classical tradition (Aphrodite, Homer and Odysseus) are typical of neoclassicism and the focus on the poet, the theme of graves and remains and the homesickness are typical of romanticism.

Prosody
The sonnet is made up of two quatrains and two tercets of hendecasyllables. The rhyme scheme is ABAB, ABAB, CDE, CED. In the poem we can find enjambments, alliterations, apostrophes, synecdoches, anastrophes and a litotes.

Bibliography
Romano Luperini, Pietro Catadi, Lidia Marchiani, Franco Marchese, Il nuovo. La scrittura e l'interpretazione, volume 1, Palumbo editore, 

1803 poems
Italian poems
Sonnets